José Carlos Herrera Vargas (born February 5, 1986) is a Mexican sprinter. At the 2012 Summer Olympics, he competed in the Men's 200 metres.

Personal bests

Outdoor
100 m: 10.21 s A (wind: +0.8 m/s) –  Xalapa, 29 August 2014
200 m: 20.29 s –  Rio de Janeiro, 17 August 2016
400 m: 46.18 s –  Monterrey, 12 March 2010
800 m: 1:54.30 min –  Monterrey, 14 March 2008

International competitions

References

External links

1986 births
Living people
Mexican male sprinters
Olympic athletes of Mexico
Athletes (track and field) at the 2012 Summer Olympics
Athletes (track and field) at the 2016 Summer Olympics
Sportspeople from Monterrey
Central American and Caribbean Games bronze medalists for Mexico
Competitors at the 2010 Central American and Caribbean Games
Competitors at the 2014 Central American and Caribbean Games
Central American and Caribbean Games medalists in athletics
21st-century Mexican people